Óliver Manuel Bocos González (born 3 September 1982), known as simply Óliver or Oli, is a Spanish footballer who plays for CD El Palo as a left defender.

Club career
Born in Puerto del Rosario, Fuerteventura, Canary Islands, Óliver graduated from Levante UD's youth system, making his senior debuts with the reserves in the 2001–02 season, in the Tercera División. On 7 November 2001 he made his professional debut with the Valencian, playing the entire second half of a 0–7 away loss against SD Eibar in the Segunda División.

In the following years Óliver competed in the Segunda División B but also in the fourth level, representing Real Jaén, Racing de Ferrol, Lucena CF, Vélez CF, CD Corralejo and CD El Palo. With the latter he achieved promotion to division three in 2013, appearing in 32 matches and scoring once.

References

External links

1982 births
Living people
Spanish footballers
Footballers from the Canary Islands
Association football defenders
Segunda División players
Segunda División B players
Tercera División players
Atlético Levante UD players
Levante UD footballers
Real Jaén footballers
Racing de Ferrol footballers
Lucena CF players